Bauska is a town in Bauska Municipality, in the Zemgale region of southern Latvia.

The town is situated at the confluence of the shallow rivers Mūsa and Mēmele where they form the Lielupe River. Rainfall averages  annually. The 80.4% of Bauska Municipality territory is agricultural land and 13% of forests.

In previous centuries, the city was known in German as Bauske, in Yiddish as Boisk, in Lithuanian as Bauskė and in Polish as "Bowsk".

The population of Bauska is estimated to be 8,200. Bauska is the centre of Bauska Municipality, a first-level national subdivision that has a population of 24,370 with an approximate density of 30 people per km2.

History

By the early 13th century this territory was inhabited by Semigallian tribes. In the mid-15th century, Bauska castle was built by Germans of the Livonian Order, who then were a part of the Terra Mariana confederacy. In the shadow and protection of the castle a small town called Schildburg grew on the narrow peninsula formed by the Mūsa and Mēmele rivers. Around 1580 on the orders of Duke Gotthard Kettler this settlement was relocated to the present location of Bauska Old Town, eventually receiving city rights sometime before 1609.

After the Livonian War, Bauska became part of the Duchy of Courland and Semigallia and prospered. The castle and city suffered heavily in the 17th and 18th centuries, under attacks from Sweden in the Polish-Swedish War and the Russians in the Great Northern War. In 1706, retreating Russian army blew up the castle. In 1711, an outbreak of plague ravaged Bauska, exterminating half of the population, and war returned once more in 1812, when Bauska, after short skirmishes, became one of Napoleon's army's transit points en route to Moscow.

Between 1812 and 1914, Bauska enjoyed a period of stability, and grew as a trade center between Riga and Lithuania. Many inhabitants were merchants or worked in ceramic-making, but there was a large brewery and sawmill as well. Bauska was still primarily built of wooden houses: in 1823, only 6 of the 120 houses within the city were built of brick or stone. For this reason, devastating fires were not uncommon.

Historically, all social affairs had been in the hands of the privileged Baltic Germans. After 1820 Jews were allowed to settle in the city, and by 1850 made up half the population, diluting the strong German influence.

The city was taken by the German Imperial Army on July 18, 1915, and roughly half the population fled (Jews were moved out on the orders of the Russian army). In 1916, the Germans installed the city's first electrical grid and built a narrow-gauge railway connection with Jelgava–Meitene Railway.

During the Latvian War of Independence Bauska experienced a couple of months of Red Army occupation, followed by the periods of rule by the Baltische Landeswehr and West Russian Volunteer Army until it was liberated in the early hours of November 17, 1919 by the Latvian army.

From 1918 to 1940, the proportion of ethnic Latvians in the population grew strongly, making up 75% of the population, though the Jews and Germans still maintained a noticeable presence. In 1939, just before World War II, virtually the entire Baltic German population of Bauska repatriated to the recently occupied Reichsgau Wartheland, causing the city to lose one of its traditional ethnic populations. As part of the Holocaust during the June–August 1941, Bauska's other traditional minority, the Jews were exterminated.

During Operation Bagration, the Soviet army reached Bauska on July 29, 1944. For the next six weeks city was defended by assortment of Latvian policemen, forcibly mobilized Latvian Legion soldiers and Wehrmacht grenadiers. After Soviet shelling and air raids almost one third of the city was destroyed and finally captured on September 14, 1944.

Post-war reconstruction was slow. Rubble remained in the streets until the 1950s. During the Soviet period, the population surpassed 10,000, as the Latvian and especially Russian populations strongly increased.

History of Jewish community

Bauska was home to a thriving Jewish community in the 19th century, many employed as scholars or in occupations such as baking and distilling. The town hosted several notable rabbis, including Abraham Isaac Kook, later chief rabbi of Israel, Mordechai Eliasberg, and Chaim Yitzchak Bloch Hacohen.

In 1850, Jews made up 50% of Bauska's population, and 60% in 1881. By 1920, the Jewish population had dwindled to about a sixth of the size it had been 40 years earlier. In 1941, following the Nazi invasion, the remaining Jews of Bauska and environs were tortured and executed.

An exhibition on the city's Jewish history was opened in 2011 in Bauska museum following a conference on Bauska's Jewish cultural heritage in the 1990s. A group of Jews who were former inhabitants of Bauska proposed to establish a memorial on the site of the Great Synagogue burnt down in July 1941. In October 2017, the "Synagogue Garden," a monument/memorial created by the Council of Jewish Communities of Latvia and Latvian sculptor, Girts Burvis, was dedicated on the site.

Demographics 

In December 2004, there were 10,178 inhabitants, 55% female and 45% male.

Tourist attractions 

Bauska castle and museum
Bauska Church of the Holy Spirit, Lutheran
Bauska Town Hall
Bauska museum
Bauska Freedom monument
Church of St. George, Orthodox
Bauska Church of the Most Holy Sacrament, Catholic
Stone of Peter the Great

Bauska's Defenders' Monument

On September 14, 2012, a monument to the inhabitants of city who organized the defense of Bauska against the Soviet assault in 1944 was unveiled in the city, with inscription "To the defenders of Bauska against the second Soviet occupation on July 28 – September 14, 1944".

Twin towns — sister cities

Bauska is twinned with:

 Hedemora, Sweden
 Khashuri, Georgia
 Náchod, Czech Republic
 Pakruojis, Lithuania
 Radviliškis, Lithuania
 Rypin, Poland
 Soroca, Moldova

Notable people

Friedrich Bernhard Albers, 18th century silversmith.
Karl Constantin Kraukling, (1792-1873), Director of the Royal History Museum, Dresden.
Arthur Böttcher, (1831 – 1889), pathologist and anatomist.
Lazar Nisselovich, (1858-1914), member of the 3rd Russian Duma.
Abraham Isaac Kook, (1865-1935), Bauska rabbi 1894-1904.
Vilis Olavs, (1867-1917), active during Latvian National Awakening.
Vilis Plūdons, (1874-1940), poet.
Krišjānis Berķis, (1884-1942), general, Minister of War.
Kristīne Nevarauska, (born 1981) actress.
Ivars Timermanis, (born 1982), basketball player.
Mārtiņš Podžus and Jānis Podžus, (born 1994), tennis players.
Elchonon Wasserman (born 1875) Famed Rabbi and Rosh Yeshiva

External links
Map of Bauska
Bauska Tourism information

References

 
Towns in Latvia
1609 establishments in the Polish–Lithuanian Commonwealth
Bauske County
Holocaust locations in Latvia
Bauska Municipality